Józef Warszawski (19031997) was a Polish philosopher.

1903 births
1997 deaths
20th-century Polish philosophers